Belleville is a city in Wayne County in the U.S. state Michigan.  The population was 3,991 at the 2010 census.

Belleville is located just south of Interstate 94 and is surrounded by Van Buren Township. Belleville Lake is the principal geographic feature, and the city is also home to the National Strawberry Festival.

History
The community was named in honor of landowner James Bell by adroitly choosing the French word for "beautiful town". The hamlet was platted in 1847 with the main thoroughfares still used today designated Main, Liberty, and High Street. About 1881, the Belleville depot on the Detroit line of the Wabash Railroad began serving travelers from across the region and the country.

Belleville was established as a village in 1905, when its governance separated from Van Buren Township by an act of the State Legislature. Located on the Huron River which was a natural trade route, the village had long been a thriving center for lumber businesses with saw mills located along the shores of the river. The large expanses of woodlands were removed to make way for farmland, industry and increasing population.

To generate more electrical power in the region, in early 1926 the Detroit Edison Company built the French Landing Dam on the river east of Belleville, thereby creating Belleville Lake. Belleville Lake is the largest inland lake in Wayne County, stretching 6 miles and covering 1,200 acres. The traditional downtown is nestled on the southern shore of Belleville Lake. Belleville achieved city status on 14 May 1946.

Geography

Belleville Lake was created by damming the Huron River when the French Landing Dam and Powerhouse was built in 1925 in neighboring Van Buren Township.

Demographics

2010 census
As of the census of 2010, there were 3,991 people, 1,755 households, and 1,005 families living in the city. The racial makeup of the city was 80.6% White, 14.1% African American, 0.4% Native American, 0.8% Asian, 1.0% from other races, and 3.2% from two or more races. Hispanic or Latino of any race were 3.8% of the population.

There were 1,755 households, of which 28.2% had children under the age of 18 living with them, 37.8% were married couples living together, 14.2% had a female householder with no husband present, 5.2% had a male householder with no wife present, and 42.7% were non-families. 36.2% of all households were made up of individuals, and 15.9% had someone living alone who was 65 years of age or older. The average household size was 2.26 and the average family size was 2.95.

The median age in the city was 40 years. 21.9% of residents were under the age of 18; 8.9% were between the ages of 18 and 24; 26.4% were from 25 to 44; 28.2% were from 45 to 64; and 14.6% were 65 years of age or older. The gender makeup of the city was 46.7% male and 53.3% female.

2000 census
As of the census of 2000, there were 3,997 people, 1,842 households, and 1,022 families living in the city. The racial makeup of the city was 87.54% White, 7.88% African American, 0.40% Native American, 1.18% Asian, 0.95% from other races, and 2.05% from two or more races. Hispanic or Latino of any race were 2.53% of the population.

There were 1,842 households, out of which 26.0% had children under the age of 18 living with them, 42.8% were married couples living together, 9.0% had a female householder with no husband present, and 44.5% were non-families. 37.1% of all households were made up of individuals, and 14.1% had someone living alone who was 65 years of age or older.  The average household size was 2.16 and the average family size was 2.87.

In the city, the population was spread out, with 21.9% under the age of 18, 6.8% from 18 to 24, 32.8% from 25 to 44, 23.2% from 45 to 64, and 15.2% who were 65 years of age or older.  The median age was 38 years. For every 100 females, there were 91.1 males.  For every 100 females age 18 and over, there were 89.2 males.

The median income for a household in the city was $44,196, and the median income for a family was $56,071. Males had a median income of $47,759 versus $30,145 for females. The per capita income for the city was $25,927.  About 3.5% of families and 6.0% of the population were below the poverty line, including 1.5% of those under age 18 and 13.3% of those age 65 and over.

Arts and culture

Festivals
Belleville hosts an annual festival, called the National Strawberry Festival. The Strawberry Festival generates considerable media coverage. People from all over Wayne County come to celebrate Belleville's economic supporter, the strawberry.

Points of interest
In the 1930s, Belleville had a reputation as a resort community where the wealthy of Detroit maintained getaway estates. Henry Ford and Charles Lindbergh once owned summer cottages on Belleville Lake, in the neighborhood of Harmony Lane.

Music
The city has been called the birthplace of techno music, namely having been home to Derrick May, Juan Atkins and Kevin Saunderson, commonly known as The Belleville Three, who were instrumental in its creation.

Education
Belleville is in the Van Buren Public Schools district. Belleville High School, Owen Intermediate, and Edgemont Elementary are located within the city limits of Belleville.

Twin city
The city is twinned with Machynlleth, Wales.

Gallery

References

External links

Belleville Community Web Portal
Belleville High School

Cities in Wayne County, Michigan
Metro Detroit
1847 establishments in Michigan
Populated places established in 1847